Colceag is a commune in Prahova County, Muntenia, Romania. It is composed of four villages: Colceag, Inotești, Parepa-Rușani and Vâlcelele.

References

External links
Official site of Châtillon-sur-Chalaronne in France, the twin city of Colceag 

Colceag
Localities in Muntenia